Snow goggles (Inuktitut:  or , syllabics: ᐃᓪᒑᒃ or ᐃᒡᒑᒃ;) are a type of eyewear traditionally used by the Inuit and the Yupik peoples of the Arctic to prevent snow blindness.

The goggles are traditionally made of driftwood (especially spruce), bone, walrus ivory, caribou antler, or in some cases seashore grass. The workpiece is carved to fit the wearer's face, and one or more narrow horizontal slits are carved through the front. The goggles fit tightly against the face so that the only light entering is through the slits, and soot is sometimes applied to the inside to help cut down on glare. The slits are made narrow not only to reduce the amount of light entering but also to improve the visual acuity. Wider slits result in a larger field of view.

Terminology
Like other Inuit language words, such as inukhuk/inuksuk, a different word may be used in different dialects. In the Kivalliq dialect,  (ᐃᓪᒑᒃ) is used, while the North Baffin dialect uses  (ᐃᒡᒑᒃ). Both words are also used to refer to sunglasses.

In Central Yup'ik, snow goggles are called , while in Cup'ig they are igguag.

See also
 Pinhole glasses

References

Goggles
Snow goggles
Snow goggles